Sumbi is a surname. Notable people with the surname include:

Joyce Sumbi (1935–2010), African-American librarian
Dayang Sumbi, mother of Sangkuriang in Indonesian legend